Qanqoli-ye Olya (also Romanized as Qānqolī-ye ‘Olyā and Qānqolī Olyā; also known as Kanghūli Alia, Kanguli-Alka, Qānqolī, and Qānqolī-ye Bālā) is a village in Ab Bar Rural District, in the Central District of Tarom County, Zanjan Province, Iran. At the 2006 census, its population was 205, in 52 families.

References 

Populated places in Tarom County